The 1946 Columbia Lions football team was an American football team that represented the Columbia University in the Ivy League during the 1946 college football season.  In their 17th season under head coach Lou Little, the team compiled a 6–3 record and outscored opponents by a total of 222 to 176.

Schedule

References

Columbia
Columbia Lions football seasons
Columbia Lions football